Rathconnell is a civil parish in County Westmeath, Ireland.

Rathconnell is one of 3 civil parishes in the barony of Moyashel and Magheradernon in the Province of Leinster.

Rathconnell civil parish comprises 34 townlands: Aghadaugh, Ballycor, Ballynagall, Balrath North, Balrath West, Balreagh, Balreath East, Brittas, Cartron, Cloghanumera, Clondalever, Clonickilvant, Clonkill, Clonlost, Clonsheever, Cooksborough, Crosserdree, Curraghbrack, Curraghmore, Drinmore, Edmondstown, Fennor, Jeffrystown, Killynan (Cooke), Killynan (Pratt), Knockdrin, Loughagar Beg, Loughagar More, Macetown, Moneylea, Mountrobert, Rathconnell, Reynella and Tevrin.

The neighbouring civil parishes are: Kilpatrick (barony of Fore), and Tyfarnham to the north, Killulagh (barony of Delvin), to the north–east, Killagh (Delvin) to the east, Killucan (barony of Farbill) to the south–east and south, Mullingar to the south–west and west and Portnashangan (barony of Corkaree) to the north–west.

References

External links
Rathconnell civil parish at the IreAtlas Townland Data Base
Rathconnell civil parish at Townlands.ie
Rathconnell civil parish at Logainm.ie

Civil parishes of County Westmeath